Krystian Szuster (born 6 March 1963) is a Polish former footballer. His career is mostly associated with his hometown club Ruch with whom he won the title in 1989. He later went on to win the Polish Cup with GKS Katowice in 1993. He played in three matches for the Poland national football team in 1989, debuting on 7 February 1989 against Costa Rica.

References

External links

1963 births
Living people
Polish footballers
Poland international footballers
GKS Katowice players
GKS Tychy players
Ruch Chorzów players
Halmstads BK players
F.C. Penafiel players
Śląsk Wrocław players
Association football midfielders